Stenoptilia coprodactylus is a moth of the family Pterophoridae. It is found in Spain, France, Italy, Switzerland, Austria, Germany, Poland, the Czech Republic, Slovakia, Hungary, Romania, Bulgaria, Serbia and Montenegro, Bosnia and Herzegovina, Albania and Russia.

The wingspan is 21–24 mm.

The larvae feed on Gentiana verna, Gentiana acaulis and Gentiana lutea.

References

coprodactylus
Moths described in 1851
Plume moths of Europe
Taxa named by Henry Tibbats Stainton